The Portland Pilots men's basketball team represents the University of Portland, located in Portland, Oregon, United States, in NCAA Division I basketball competition. They have played their home games at the Chiles Center since 1984, and are members of the West Coast Conference.

Postseason results

NCAA tournament
The Pilots have appeared in two NCAA tournaments. Their combined record is 0–2.

CIT results
The Pilots have appeared in four CollegeInsider.com Tournaments. Their combined record is 0–4.

The Basketball Classic results
The Pilots have appeared in one The Basketball Classic Tournament. Their record is 1-1

NAIA tournament results
The Pilots have appeared in the NAIA Tournament eight times. Their combined record is 5–9.

Venues
Columbia Coliseum, 1922–27
Howard Hall, 1927–1978, 1980–85
Portland Ice Arena 1949–1953
Pacific International Livestock Exposition Building 1951–53, 1958–1960
First Regiment Armory Annex 1953–58
Hudson's Bay High School 1956–1966, 1978–1982
Memorial Coliseum, 1960–1984
Pamplin Sports Center, 1979–1983
Chiles Center, 1984–present

Pilots in professional leagues

Pinhas Hozez (born 1957), Israeli basketball player, Israeli Basketball Premier League
Luke Sikma (born 1989), American basketball player; son of NBA Hall of Famer Jack Sikma, ALBA Berlin, EuroLeague
Darwin Cook (born 1958)
Erik Spoelstra (born 1970)
Jose Slaughter (born 1960)

References

External links
 

 
Pilots